The Grand Synagogue of Tunis is a synagogue inside the Tunisian capital of Tunis.

History

20th century 

The idea for a synagogue was originally requested by the 19th-century Italian Jewish statesman , and finally established in 1937 by French architect , who chose to design it in the Art Deco architectural style. The synagogue was shut down by Nazi Germany during the German occupation of Tunisia, but resumed operations after the country was liberated by Allied forces.

In 1967, anti-Jewish rioters motivated by the then-ongoing Six-Day War trashed and looted the synagogue, burning it to the ground and destroying the sacred Torah scrolls, resulting in the abandonment of the building. In the 1990s Zine El Abidine Ben Ali funded the building's restoration.

21st century 

In 2011 Islamic extremist rioters attacked the synagogue and damaged it, chanting Khaybar, Khaybar during the riot.

Tariq Ahmad, Baron Ahmad of Wimbledon toured the Grand Synagogue during a two-day visit to Tunisia in early June 2022. On 24 June 2022, a person ran towards the synagogue and stabbed two officers, lightly injuring them. Authorities identified the stabbing as a terrorist attack and said its perpetrator had previously been arrested on terrorism and violence-related charges.

References 

Synagogues in Tunisia
1937 establishments in Tunisia
1937 in Judaism
Religious buildings and structures in Tunis
Antisemitism in Tunisia